The 1955 Japan Series was the Nippon Professional Baseball (NPB) championship series for the 1955 season. It was the sixth Japan Series and featured the Pacific League champions, the Nankai Hawks, against the Central League champions, the Yomiuri Giants.

Summary

Matchups

Game 1
Saturday, October 15, 1955 – 2:02 pm at Osaka Stadium in Osaka, Osaka Prefecture

Game 2
Sunday, October 16, 1955 – 2:00 pm at Osaka Stadium in Osaka, Osaka Prefecture

Game 3
Tuesday, October 18, 1955 – 2:03 pm at Korakuen Stadium in Bunkyō, Tokyo

Game 4
Friday, October 21, 1955 – 2:00 pm at Korakuen Stadium in Bunkyō, Tokyo

Game 5
Saturday, October 22, 1955 – 1:01 pm at Korakuen Stadium in Bunkyō, Tokyo

Game 6
Sunday, October 23, 1955 – 2:00 pm at Osaka Stadium in Osaka, Osaka Prefecture

Game 7
Monday, October 24, 1955 – 2:00 pm at Osaka Stadium in Osaka, Osaka Prefecture

See also
1955 World Series

References

Japan Series
Japan Series
Japan Series
Japan series